The Land Tax was a land value tax levied in England from 1692 to 1963, though such taxes predate the best-known 1692 Act. Taxes on land date back to the Norman Conquest and beyond, and the Land Tax introduced in 1692 was a natural successor to taxation acts in 1671 and 1689, but the 1692 act "has been regarded as a turning point in the history of English revenue collection. It was from this Act that contemporaries and historians alike date what has come to be known as the eighteenth-century Land Tax". The land tax elements of the 1671, 1689 and 1692 Acts were limited to one year but the 1798 Act made the tax perpetual (until it was abolished in 1963).

A Land Tax had also applied in Scotland from 1667. After the Acts of Union 1707, the Scottish charge was included in subsequent Acts of the Parliament of Great Britain.

Subsidy Act 1670/71 (22 & 23 Car. 2 c. 3)

"An Act for granting a Subsidy to his Majestie for Supply of his Extraordinary Occasions" was enacted in the reign of Charles II. This act was described by Cecil Chandaman as "the product of the hardest and most constructive thinking by the Commons on the subject of direct taxation during the Restoration period". Beckett calls it "an attempt to resurrect and renovate the basic principle of the old subsidy which national wealth would be assessed at a pound rate", and thus the precursor of the 1689 and 1692 acts. Among the many revenue-raising elements, section IX specifies that "Lands, Mines, &c. to pay 12d. in the Pound of the yearly Value for one Year".

Land Tax Act 1688 (1 Will. & Mary c 20) 

 
The 1689 Act aimed to capture income from all sources: business, employment and land (the main source of wealth in the seventeenth century and for many years afterwards). In a sense, it was a general income tax, although income was not itself assessed. The state lacked the administrative machinery to measure actual income. Instead, income was calculated indirectly by reference to the deemed yield from the capital value of assets, to which was applied a rate of twelve pence (one shilling) in the pound (5%). However, despite this, it soon proved impracticable to collect much tax from business and employment, and the main yield of the tax came from the charges on land. Hence before long, the tax came to be called the Land Tax, and the annual Land Tax Acts used this name. The business and employment charges lingered on, and were repealed by 1877. 

The charge on land in 1689 depended on a valuation of all property throughout the country to find its open market rental value. That value was the income subject to the tax. Because, no doubt, of the difficulty and expense of valuation, the same values were used in subsequent years. As time passed the original valuation become increasingly unrealistic and, moreover, the relative value of property in different areas changed, especially as the Industrial Revolution got underway. Poor land in places that became major powerhouses increased hugely in value. Surprisingly, however, there was never another valuation in the entire 271-year history of Land Tax, even though it was re-enacted annually until 1798, when it was made permanent. Naturally, there were many complaints over the years about the unfair incidence of the tax, but MPs for the lightly taxed areas resisted reform.

Land Tax Act 1692 (4 Will. & Mary c. 1)

The 1692 Act is introduced simply as "an Act for granting to their Majesties an Aid of four shillings in the pound for one year, for carrying on a vigorous war against France", but subsequently became known as one of the Land Tax Acts. (Four shillings in the pound equates to 20% of imputed income based on the value of the asset.)

Land Tax Act 1697 (8 & 9 Gul. III c. 6)

The 1697 Act, "'An Act for granting an Aid to His Majesty as well by a Land Tax as by several Subsidies and other Duties payable for One Yeare", the third of the 17th century Land Tax Acts, is the first to say so explicitly in its title. Despite the Act levying a poll tax, income taxes and a variety of other taxes in addition to the land tax, the tax raised just 87% of the 1693 yield. In the 1697 Act, Land Tax became a quota tax. That is, after several years of falling yields, the government decided to abandon the attempt to measure assets. Instead, they raised a set sum from England and Wales based on the yield from the 1692 Act. That Act imposed a tax at four shillings in the pound and raised about £2 million (about £ million today).  The quota Acts subsequently raised one of four sums depending on the budgetary requirements of the year: £2 million, £1.5 million, £1 million or £0.5 million using nominal rates of four shillings, three shillings, two shillings and one shilling. The rates were nominal because they were not used to calculate the annual amount. By the end of the eighteenth century, four shillings had become the usual rate.

The quota Acts divided the total for England and Wales between towns and counties using the 1689 valuations, which were never revised. Land Tax Acts thereafter listed each town and county by name together with the amount of quota due. The amounts due from each place only changed in proportion to the fixed sum for the whole country. For example, if the rate was four shillings a place might have to pay £10,000 out of the £2 million total. If the rate was two shillings, the total for the country became £1 million, and the place would have to pay £5,000. Unpaid local worthies were appointed by the Acts to run the tax, and they split the total for their area down to parishes and individual properties in proportion to the 1689 valuations. Usually, the commissioners carried the same valuation for each property forward from one year to the next. After the Acts of Union 1707, the annual Land Tax Act also included a fixed sum for Scotland.

Land Tax Perpetuation Act 1798 (Great Britain)

Nor was there a new valuation in 1798 when the Land Tax Perpetuation Act (38 Geo. III c.60) made the Land Tax permanent, although some MPs complained that the government was setting historic injustices in stone. Prime Minister William Pitt resisted a new valuation on the grounds that the 1692 figures had been used for over 100 years despite the annual opportunity for reevaluation when the tax was re-imposed. Parliament had had plenty of chances to reform, and had been content to continue the old system; so there was no reason to change now. In the midst of war, Pitt probably had no time to undertake a new valuation.

Land Tax was made permanent because Pitt devised a scheme to offer property owners the option to buy out ('redeem') future Land Tax by paying a lump sum. The government gave up its future stream of tax for an immediate capital payment. It was necessary for Land Tax to be converted from an annual tax into a permanent tax so there would be a permanent obligation that could be bought and sold. (Otherwise, property owners would be unlikely to pay a large lump sum to redeem a tax which might not be re-imposed in the future.) The scheme was a reasonable success. The annual Land Tax yield was then about £2 million (say £ million today) and about a quarter was redeemed by the end of 1800, producing just over £9 million (say £ million today) for the government. Over the next 50 years, only an additional £400,000 of Land Tax was redeemed, despite attempts to make the option more attractive. After 1800, the value of Land Tax to the government continued to decline, partly because of redemption and partly because of inflation. 

For most of the eighteenth century, the bulk of government revenue came from customs and excise—taxes on everyday goods such as salt, candles, leather, beer, soap and starch, as well as luxury goods like wine, brandy, silks, gold and silver thread, silver plate, horses, coaches and hats. In the middle of the eighteenth century, the Land Tax accounted for about 15% of the total tax revenue.

Until the mid-19th century the land tax commissioners were local property owners acting without remuneration. Latterly they also had responsibility for collecting the Duty on Pensions, Offices, and Personal Estates. Periodically an act was passed listed all the names of the commissioners to be appointed, grouped by the area within which they had authority. It has been displayed (rolled up) in exhibitions in the Westminster Royal Gallery in 2004, and the People's History Museum in 2021.

References

Notes

Citations

See also
 History of taxation in the United Kingdom

External links
  (Audio-visual presentation, 45 minutes.)

Land taxation
Taxation in England